The Leader of the Opposition of Barbados is the Member of Parliament who leads the Official Opposition in the Barbados Parliament. The Leader of the Opposition is the leader of the largest political party in the House of Assembly of Barbados that is not in government.

Overview 

The political party or coalition that wins a majority of seats in Parliament forms the government headed by a Prime Minister of Barbados. The political party with the second-largest majority forms the Official Opposition whose leader as the Leader of the Opposition.

List of leaders of the opposition 

 Sir Grantley Herbert Adams (1966 - 1970)
 Harold Bernard St. John (1970 - 1971)
 Tom Adams (1971 - 1976)
 Frederick G. Smith (1976 - 1978)
 Errol Barrow (1978 - 1986)
 Henry deBoulay Forde (1986 - 1989)
 Richard Christopher Haynes (1989 - 1991)
 Owen Arthur (1 August 1993 – 6 September 1994)
 David Thompson (September 1994 – September 2000)
 Clyde Mascoll (September 2000 – January 2006)
 David Thompson (January 2006 – January 2008)

 Mia Mottley (7 February 2008 – 18 October 2010)
 Owen Arthur (18 October 2010 – 26 February 2013)
 Mia Mottley (26 February 2013 – 25 May 2018)

 Joseph Atherley (1 June 2018 – 19 January 2022)

See also 

 Cabinet of Barbados

References 

Lists of political office-holders in Barbados
Opposition leaders